Mary Antonia Wood (born 1959 in Page, Arizona) is an American painter and sculptor of Mexican descent who creates two- and three-dimensional constructions. In 1981, she received her bachelor of fine arts degree from Northern Arizona University and continued her studies at the University of New Mexico. Wood's works explore traditions of pre-Hispanic Mexican and Central American art. They are created by applying plaster to wood panels with several coats of natural beeswax.

References

1959 births
Living people
American artists of Mexican descent
Sculptors from Arizona
Hispanic and Latino American women in the arts
20th-century American women artists
People from Page, Arizona
Northern Arizona University alumni
University of New Mexico alumni
American women painters
American women sculptors
20th-century American painters
20th-century American sculptors
21st-century American painters
21st-century American sculptors
21st-century American women artists